The Mughal–Safavid War of 1622–1623 was fought over the important fortress city of Kandahar, in Afghanistan, between the Safavid Empire and the Mughal Empire.

Shah Abbas desired to capture the strategic fortress on Kandahar since he had lost it in 1595. In 1605 the governor of Herat, Husein Khan, besieged the city but the tenacious defense of the Mughal governor, Shah Beg Khan, and the arrival in the next year of a relieving Mughal army to Kandahar forced the Safavids to retreat. With the conclusion of the Ottoman–Safavid War (1603–18), Shah Abbas was secure enough for a war on his eastern frontier, so in 1621 he ordered an army to gather at Nishapur. After celebrating the Iranian New Year at Tabas Gilaki in southern Khorasan, Abbas joined with his army and marched on Kandahar where he arrived on 20 May and immediately began the siege. Though Jahangir had information of the Persian's movements he was slow to respond, and without reinforcements the small garrison of 3,000 men could not hold for long.

The Emperor asked his son and heir apparent Khurram who was at Mandu in the Deccan to lead the campaign, but Khurram evaded the assignment fearing to lose his political power while he was away from court. The relief force the Mughal's could assemble proved too small to raise the siege, so after a 45-day siege the city fell on 22 June followed shortly after by Zamindawar. After fortifying the city and appointing Ganj Ali Khan as governor of the city, Abbas returned to Khorasan via Ghur, subduing on the way troubling emirs in Chaghcharan and Gharjistan. The rebellion of Khurram absorbed the Mughal's attention, so in the spring of 1623 a Mughal envoy arrived at the Shah's camp with a letter from the Emperor accepting the loss of Kandahar and putting an end to the conflict.

Notes

Sources

17th-century conflicts
Battles involving the Mughal Empire
Conflicts in 1622
Conflicts in 1623
Wars involving Safavid Iran
Wars involving Afghanistan
History of Kandahar
1622 in Asia
1623 in Asia
17th century in Afghanistan
Wars involving the Mughal Empire